The 2008 Swedish Short Course Swimming Championships took place in Eriksdalsbadet, Sweden between November 27, 2008 and November 30, 2008. 44 champions were declared.

Medal table

Medalists
NR denotes National Record
CR denotes Championship Record

Men's

|-
|50 m freestyle

|-
|100 m freestyle

|-
|200 m freestyle

|-
|400 m freestyle

|-
|1500 m freestyle

|-
|50 m backstroke

|-
|100 m backstroke

|-
|200 m backstroke

|-
|50 m breaststroke

|-
|100 m breaststroke

|-
|200 m breaststroke

|-
|50 m butterfly

|-
|100 m butterfly

|-
|200 m butterfly

|-
|100 m individual medley

|-
|200 m individual medley

|-
|400 m individual medley

|- valign=top
|4 × 50 m freestyle relay

|- valign=top
|4 × 100 m freestyle relay

|- valign=top
|4 × 200 m freestyle relay

|- valign=top
|4 × 50 m medley relay

|- valign=top
|4 × 100 m medley relay

|}

Women's

|-
|50 m freestyle

|-
|100 m freestyle

|-
|200 m freestyle

|-
|400 m freestyle

|-
|800 m freestyle

|-
|50 m backstroke

|-
|100 m backstroke

|-
|200 m backstroke

|-
|50 m breaststroke

|-
|100 m breaststroke

|-
|200 m breaststroke

|-
|50 m butterfly

|-
|100 m butterfly

|-
|200 m butterfly

|-
|100 m individual medley

|-
|200 m individual medley

|-
|400 m individual medley

|- valign=top
|4 × 50 m freestyle relay

|- valign=top
|4 × 100 m freestyle relay

|- valign=top
|4 × 200 m freestyle relay

|- valign=top
|4 × 50 m medley relay

|- valign=top
|4 × 100 m medley relay

|}

See also
2008 in swimming

Swedish Short Course Swimming Championships
Swimming Championships
Swedish Short Course Swimming Championships
Sports competitions in Stockholm
2000s in Stockholm
November 2008 sports events in Europe